Stuyvesant Falls Mill District is a national historic district located in the town of Stuyvesant in Columbia County, New York.  The district includes six contributing buildings, five contributing sites, and two contributing structures.  They are the industrial sites and power sources from which the adjoining village of Stuyvesant Falls derived its livelihood.  It includes the Upper and Lower Falls and mill dams; on the east bank of Kinderhook Creek the sites of a grist mill and paper mill, cotton mill, woolen mill complex and extant hydroelectric plant; west bank operations including three extant 19th century cotton mills and several dwellings.  Also included is an iron truss bridge erected in 1899.

It was listed on the National Register of Historic Places in 1976.

References

Historic districts on the National Register of Historic Places in New York (state)
Industrial buildings and structures on the National Register of Historic Places in New York (state)
Archaeological sites on the National Register of Historic Places in New York (state)
Historic districts in Columbia County, New York
National Register of Historic Places in Columbia County, New York